The Backyard is a 1920 American silent comedy film featuring Oliver Hardy.

Cast
 Jimmy Aubrey as Almost a cop 
 Oliver Hardy as The ruffian (as Babe Hardy)
 Jack Ackroyd as A millionaire
 Kathleen Myers as His daughter
 Evelyn Nelson as His daughter

See also
 List of American films of 1920
 Oliver Hardy filmography

External links

1920 films
American silent short films
American black-and-white films
1920 comedy films
Films directed by Jess Robbins
1920 short films
Silent American comedy films
American comedy short films
1920s American films